A list of films produced in France in 1949.

See also
 1949 in France

References

External links
 French films of 1949 at the Internet Movie Database
French films of 1949 at Cinema-francais.fr

1949
Films
French